White Xmas Lies is the third solo album by Magne Furuholmen as Magne F. The album, released on October 25, 2019, comes in three versions: white vinyl, CD and digital.
There is also a limited 200 copies edition in white vinyl with exclusive art print.
The artwork for the album is created by Furuholmen himself.

In August 2019 Magne Furuholmen released a new solo song titled This is now America on Instagram, which Furuholmen explained was a protest song in direct protest to the Trump administration in an interview with Rolling Stone. The single was published along with a home-made music video directed and edited by his son Thomas Vincent.
On February 21, 2020, a brand new video was released for this song, and it was premiered by Rolling Stone (French edition). The video is both spectacular and disturbing and was made in collaboration with experimental German theatre/performance duo Vinge-Müller and Magne Furuholmen's son Thomas Vincent.

In an interview Furuholmen said he is “ashamed to be part of a Christmas which these days seems to be mostly about buying more and more sh** that no one needs or even really wants…a tacky, superficial celebration in stark contrast to the original Christmas message of hope, charity, and compassion”. Furuholmen also described the album as 'a dark, melancholic christmas record – as an antidote to the cheesy xmas song covers that everyone and his brother churns out these days'.

Track listing

Personnel 
From liner notes:

 Magne Furuholmen - vocals, piano, guitars, keyboards, programming, church organ, percussion, string arrangements
 Karl Oluf Wennerberg - drums, percussion
 Even Ormestad - bass
 Madeleine Ossum - violin, backing vocals on tracks 6 and 8, string arrangements
 Emilie Lidsheim - viola, backing vocals on tracks 6 and 8, string arrangements
 Ingvild Nesdal Sandnes - cello, backing vocals on tracks 6 and 8, string arrangements
 Tini Flaat Mykland - backing vocals on tracks 1, 3 and 8; vocals on track 16
 Morten Qvenild - instruments and programming on tracks 7, 12 and 17

References

External links 
 

Christmas albums by Norwegian artists
2019 Christmas albums
Magne Furuholmen albums